Paul E. Haeberli is an American computer graphics programmer and researcher.

Biography
Paul Haeberli studied for a Bachelor of Science degree in electrical engineering at the University of Wisconsin–Madison, United States.

Haeberli was recruited by James H. Clark to join Silicon Graphics during the company's founding.  Haeberli's early work included code, developed with David J. Brown and Mark Grossman, for SGI's first product – the Iris1000. Between 1983–1999, Haeberli continued at Silicon Graphics in Silicon Valley, California. He worked on the early MEX window system for Silicon Graphics workstations. He was also involved in non-photorealistic rendering (NPR) techniques in computer graphics, producing software to implement this approach. He devised the Silicon Graphics Image (SGI) format for graphics files. Later, he became an initial member of the research team at Silicon Graphics.

After Silicon Graphics, Haeberli joined Shutterfly, where he developed much of the online technology and image-processing foundations for the system that Shutterfly later employed in production.

Subsequently he founded Lamina Design, which allows freeform structures to be constructed from sheet material using computer-based techniques. The company is based in Madison, Wisconsin.

References

External links
 
 

Year of birth missing (living people)
Living people
University of Wisconsin–Madison College of Engineering alumni
American computer programmers
Computer graphics professionals
Computer graphics researchers
Silicon Graphics people
American people of Swiss descent